Mark Helfrich may refer to:
Mark Helfrich (American football) (born 1973), American football coach
Mark Helfrich (film editor) (born 1957), American film editor
Mark Helfrich (politician) (born 1978), German politician